Wiedersehen mit Marlene is a Marlene Dietrich's live album, issued on Electrola, catalogue number 1C 062-28 473 MD, in Germany. The American pressing on Capitol Records (Capitol T10282) does not include "Kinder, heut' abend, da such ich mir was aus". 

Although it was marketed as a "live" album, it features studio recordings made in Germany in 1960 overdubbed with applause recorded on tour to create live atmosphere. An East German issue on Amiga Records, Hallo Marlene (Amiga 840030), presents ten of the tracks without the overdubbed applause. The album was released in CD format, on February 6, 2006, by DRG Records. 

The album peaked at #3 in the German charts.

Background and production
After leaving Germany due to the rise of Hitler and Nazism Dietrich's return to West Germany in 1960 for a concert tour which was met with mixed reception— despite a consistently negative press, vociferous protest by chauvinistic Germans who felt she had betrayed her homeland, and two bomb threats, her performance attracted huge crowds. During her performances at Berlin's Titania Palast theatre, protesters chanted, "Marlene Go Home!" On the other hand, Dietrich was warmly welcomed by other Germans, including Berlin Mayor Willy Brandt, who was, like Dietrich, an opponent of the Nazis who had lived in exile during their rule. The tour was an artistic triumph, but a financial failure. She was left emotionally drained by the hostility she encountered, and she left convinced never to visit again. East Germany, however, received her well. A record was made and it was entitled Wiedersehen mit Marlene but although it was marketed as a "live" album, it features studio recordings made in Germany in 1960 overdubbed with applause recorded on tour to create live atmosphere of one of the shows she id in German.

Critical and commercial reception
LIFE magazine  gave the album a favourable review and wrote that the album was recommended "mainly for the sentimental roué set." The album peaked at #3 in the German charts.

Track listing

Sources

References

1960 live albums
German-language albums
Marlene Dietrich albums